Bradley Ihionvien (born 23 December 2003) is an English professional footballer who plays as a forward for  club Maldon & Tiptree, on loan from  club Colchester United.

Career
Ihionvien came through the Academy at Colchester United to make his first-team debut on 7 May 2022, when he came on as a 71st-minute substitute for John Akinde in a 2–0 victory at Hartlepool United.

Career statistics

References

2003 births
Living people
English footballers
Association football forwards
Colchester United F.C. players
Maldon & Tiptree F.C. players
English Football League players
Isthmian League players
Black British sportspeople